Bankura is a city and a municipality in Bankura District in the state of West Bengal, India.

Bankura may also refer to the following geographical locations:
Bankura district, West Bengal
Bankura Sadar subdivision, West Bengal
Bankura I, Community development block, West Bengal
Bankura II, Community development block, West Bengal
Bankura (Lok Sabha constituency), West Bengal
Bankura (Vidhan Sabha constituency), West Bengal
 Bankura architecture, a style of traditional Bengal architecture.